Petka  may refer to:

 Pětka or Committee of Five, a Czechoslovak organization
 Petka, Iran, a village in Mazandaran Province, Iran
 Saint Petka, an ascetic female saint from the Eastern Roman Empire
 Petka (Požarevac), a village in Serbia
 Petka, Lazarevac, a suburb of Lazarevac, Belgrade, Serbia
 Edward Petka, American attorney and politician
 Pyotr Isaev, Soviet commander, Vasily Chapaev's aide

See also